Sosumi is an alert sound introduced by Jim Reekes in Apple Inc.'s Macintosh System 7 operating system in 1991. The name is derived from the phrase "so, sue me!" because of a long running court battle with Apple Corps, the similarly named music company, regarding the use of music in Apple Inc.'s computer products.

History
Sosumi is a short xylophone sample, which gained notoriety in computer folklore as a defiant pun name, in response to a long-running Apple Corps v. Apple Computer trademark conflict. The sound has been included in all subsequent versions of Mac OS.

During the development of System 7, the two companies concluded a settlement agreement from an earlier dispute when Apple added a sound synthesis chip to its Apple IIGS machine.  As a result, Apple Computer was prohibited from using its trademark on "creative works whose principal content is music".

When new sounds for System 7 were created, the sounds were reviewed by Apple's Legal Department who objected that the new sound alert "chime" had a name that was "too musical", under the recent settlement. Jim Reekes, the creator of the new sound alerts for System 7, had grown frustrated with the legal scrutiny and first quipped it should be named "Let It Beep", a pun on "Let It Be". When someone remarked that that would not pass the Legal Department's approval, he remarked, "so sue me". After a brief reflection, he resubmitted the sound's name as sosumi (a homophone of "so sue me"). Careful to submit it in written form rather than spoken form to avoid pronunciation, he told the Legal Department that the name was Japanese and had nothing to do with music.

In macOS Big Sur, the original chime was replaced with a different sample, due to be named "Sonumi" (presumably a homophone of "so new me", due to the change to macOS 11). However, the original name was retained in the first public version of the OS, and was later changed to "Sonumi" as it appears in the System Preferences. The sound file itself in /System/Library/Sounds/ is still named Sosumi.aiff.

In popular culture
The term is in the poem "A Short Address to the Academy of Silence" by Jay Parini.

Jon Lech Johansen's weblog "So Sue Me" is commonly mistakenly believed to be a reference to the Apple sound.

Apple used the CSS class name "sosumi" for formatting legal fine print on Apple product web pages.

In 2006, Geek Squad used this sound in their commercial "Jet Pack", in which a woman was frustrated over her computer.

See also 
 Apple Corps v. Apple Computer
 Apple libel dispute with Carl Sagan for a similar revenge-by-pun anecdote

References

Macintosh operating systems user interface
Digital audio
Apple Corps